The golden mandarin fish (Siniperca scherzeri), also known as the leopard mandarin fish, is a species of freshwater ray-finned fish, an Asian perch from the family Sinipercidae, which is native to eastern Asia (Korea, China, and Vietnam). It is typically yellowish-brown with blackish-brown speckles ("leopard"), but there are also bright yellow ("golden") individuals, which are particularly prized in Korea and selectively bred in captivity.

It is a commercially important fish, but has declined due to overfishing and habitat loss. It is farmed; typically using pure specimens, but sometimes involving hybrids with the faster-growing mandarin fish (Siniperca chuatsi). Danyang County, North Chungcheong Province organizes a fishing festival for golden mandarin fish every April.

References

Siniperca
Fish of Asia
Fish of China
Fish of Korea
Taxa named by Franz Steindachner
Fish described in 1892